The third season of the Case Closed anime was directed by Kenji Kodama and produced by TMS Entertainment and Yomiuri Telecasting Corporation. The plot in these episodes continues Jimmy Kudo's life as a young child named Conan Edogawa and features the introduction of the gentleman thief, Phantom Thief Kid.

The episodes use six pieces of theme music: one opening theme and two closing themes in the Japanese episodes and one opening theme and two ending themes in the English adaption. Thereafter  by Deen was used for the rest of the season. The English opening theme was "Nazo", with English lyrics by Stephanie Nadolny. The first English ending theme was "Hikari to Kage no Roman" with English lyrics also by Stephanie Nadolny, used until episode seventy-two. It was followed by "Kimi ga inai Natsu" with English lyrics by Carl Finch.

The season ran from April 21, 1997 through November 24, 1997 on Nippon Television Network System in Japan. Episodes fifty-five to eighty-two were later collected into seven DVD compilations by Shogakukan and were released on March 24, 2006. The season was later licensed and dubbed by Funimation Entertainment and released in ten DVD compilations between August 24, 2004 and December 20, 2005. They were later collected into a DVD boxset on November 25, 2008 containing episodes fifty-three to seventy-nine (fifty-two to seventy-six in the Japanese numbering). The Viridian edition of the season was slated for release on March 23, 2010.


Episode listing

Notes

 The episode's numbering as followed in Japan
 The episode's numbering as followed by Funimation Entertainment
 The episodes were aired as a single hour long episode in Japan
 These episodes are part of the fourth season of Case Closed

References
General

Specific

1997 Japanese television seasons
Season 3